(born January 28, 1956 in Nagasaki, Japan) is a Japanese manga artist, illustrator, and painter.

Biography
Maruo graduated from junior high school in March 1972 but dropped out of senior high school. At the age of 15, he moved to Tokyo and began working for a bookbinder. At 17, he made his first manga submission to Weekly Shōnen Jump, but it was considered by the editors to be too graphic for the magazine's format and was subsequently rejected. Maruo temporarily removed himself from manga until November 1980 when he made his official debut as a manga artist in Ribon no Kishi (リボンの騎士) at the age of 24. It was at this stage that the young artist was finally able to pursue his artistic vision without such stringent restrictions over his work’s visual content. Two years later, his first stand-alone anthology, Barairo no Kaibutsu (薔薇色の怪物; Rose Colored Monster) was published.

Maruo was a frequent contributor to the underground manga magazine Garo (ガロ).

Like many manga artists, Maruo sometimes makes cameo appearances in his own stories. When photographed, he seldom appears without his trademark sunglasses.

Though most prominently known for his work as a manga artist, Maruo has also produced illustrations for concert posters; CD jackets; magazines; novels; and various other media. Some of his characters have been made into figures as well.

Though relatively few of Maruo's manga have been published outside Japan, his work enjoys an international cult following.

His book Shōjo Tsubaki (aka Mr. Arashi's Amazing Freak Show) has been adapted into an animated film (Midori) by Hiroshi Harada with a soundtrack by J.A. Seazer, but it has received very little release.  In Europe and North America, it was marketed under the name Midori, after the main character. It was recently released on DVD in France by Cinemalta (the DVD includes English subtitles).

Style
Many of Maruo's illustrations depict graphic sex and violence and are therefore referred to as contemporary muzan-e (a subset of Japanese ukiyo-e depicting violence or other atrocities.) Maruo himself featured in a 1988 book on the subject with fellow artist Kazuichi Hanawa entitled Bloody Ukiyo-e (江戸昭和競作無惨絵英名二十八衆句), presenting their own contemporary works alongside the traditional prints of Yoshitoshi and Yoshiiku.

Maruo's nightmarish manga fall into the Japanese category of "erotic grotesque" (エログロ; "ero-guro"). The stories often take place in the early years of Showa Era Japan. Maruo also has a fascination with human oddities, deformities, birth defects, and "circus freaks." Many such characters figure prominently in his stories and are sometimes the primary subjects of his illustrations. Two of his most recent works are adaptations of stories by Edogawa Rampo, such as "The Strange Tale of Panorama Island" and "The Caterpillar". An English translation of The Strange Tale of Panorama Island work was published by Last Gasp in July 2013.

John Zorn's Naked City
Composer John Zorn used Suehiro illustrations for the liner art of his band Naked City's albums. Zorn has contributed the foreword to Suehiro's latest collection of works (published in 2005).

Bibliography
薔薇色ノ怪物 (Barairo no Kaibutsu)
1982, July 25 – Seirindo
1992 – Seirindo 
2000, February 25 – Seirindo  (new edition)
夢のQ-SAKU (Yume no Q-SAKU)
1982, December 25 – Seirindo 
2000, April 14 – Seirindo  (new edition)
DDT
1983, November 25 – Seirindo 
1999, January 25 – 青林工藝舎  (new edition)
少女椿 (Shōjo Tsubaki)
1984, September 25 – Seirindo 
1999, August 25 – Seirindo  (revised edition)
2003, October 24 – 青林工藝舎  (2003 revised edition)
キンランドンス (Kinrandonsu)
1985, September 1 – Seirindo 
2000, June 20 – Seirindo  (new edition)
 丸尾末広ONLY YOU (maruo suehiro ONLY YOU)
1985, December 25
パラノイア・スター (Paranoia Star)
1986, January 31
1994, September 25 – 秋田書店 
江戸昭和競作無惨絵英名二十八衆句 (Edo Shōwa Kyōsaku Muzan-e Eimei Nijūhasshūku (Bloody Ukiyo-e in 1866 & 1988))
1988, January 20
丸尾地獄 (Maruo Jigoku)
1983, November 25
2001, October 2
国立少年 (ナショナルキッド) (Kokuritsu Shōnen (National Kid))
1989, August 1 – Seirindo 
犬神博士 (Inugami Hakase)
serialized in Young Champion
1994, September 25
風の魔転郎 (Kaze no Matenrō)
1995, April 25 – 徳間書店 
丸尾地獄2 (Maruo Jigoku 2)
1995 – Seirindo
2001 December 12 – Seirindo
丸尾画報1 (MARUOGRAPH1) (Maruo Gahō 1)
1996, September 1 – トレヴィル
丸尾画報2 (MARUOGRAPH2) (Maruo Gahō 2)
1996, November 1 – トレヴィル
ギチギチくん (Gichigichi-kun)
serialized in Young Champion
1996, December 1 – 秋田書店 
月的愛人LUNATIC LOVER'S
1997, February 25 – Seirindo
1999, December 20 – Seirindo
マルヲグラフ (Maruograph)
1999, March 1 – パロマ舎
新ナショナルキッド (NEW NATIONAL KID) (Shin National Kid)
1999, November 25 – 青林工藝舎 
笑う吸血鬼 (Warau Kyūketsuki (Laughing Vampire))
1998-1999 - serialized in Young Champion
2000, March 15 – 秋田書店 
マルヲボックス 特装版 (Maruo Box)
2000, August 1 – パロマ舎 (limited edition of 50)
 マルヲボックス 普及版 (Maruo Box)
2000, August 1 – パロマ舎 (limited edition of 100)
 新世紀ＳＭ画報 (Shinseiki SM Gahō)
2000, August 20 – 朝日ソノラマ
ハライソ 笑う吸血鬼２ (Paraiso: Warau Kyūketsuki 2)
2003 - serialized in Young Champion
2004 – 秋田書店 
丸尾画報EX1 (MARUOGRAPH EX 1) (Maruo Gahō EX 1)
2005, June 11 – Editions Treville Pan-Exotica  (new expanded edition of 丸尾画報1)
丸尾画報EX2 (MARUOGRAPH EX 2) (Maruo Gahō EX 2)
2005, August 11 – Editions Treville Pan-Exotica  (new expanded edition of 丸尾画報2)
 
2008, February 25 – Enterbrain  (adaptation of an Edogawa Rampo story)

Translations
 Shōjo Tsubaki (少女椿) published by Blast Books. 
 Ultra-Gash Inferno (selected short works) published by Creation Books. 
 Comics Underground Japan (anthology including Maruo's story "Planet of the Jap") published by Blast Books. 
 The Strange Tale of Panorama Island (パノラマ島綺譚) published by Last Gasp. 
 How to Rake Leaves published by Stone Bridge Press. 
 How to Take a Japanese Bath published by Stone Bridge Press.

Figures and toys
人間豹と少年探偵 (ningenhyō to shōnen tantei) The Leopard-man and the Young Detectives produced by Eastpress (イーストプレス) of Japan
少女椿 (shōjo midori) Young Girl Midori 18 cm figure produced by Artstorm (アート・ストーム) of Japan

Notes

Sources

External links
Suehiro Maruo's official website
Blast Books – English publisher of Maruo's manga
Creation Books – English publisher of Maruo's manga
Le Lézard Noir – French publisher of Maruo's manga
Coconino Press – Italian publisher of Maruo's manga
Editions Treville – Japanese publisher of Maruograph artbooks
Eastpress Toy – Japanese manufacturer of Maruo's action figure
Artstorm – Japanese manufacturer of Maruo's action figure
Suehiro Maruo Shrine fan site
Article on the animated film of Shōjo Tsubaki
Suehiro Maruo on FuckedUpArt.com

 
Manga artists from Nagasaki Prefecture
Ero guro
Living people
Winner of Tezuka Osamu Cultural Prize (New Artist Prize)
1956 births
Japanese horror writers
Japanese horror fiction